Dowgun (also Romanized as Dowgūn, Doogan, and Dūgan; also known as Dārgān, Dehgān, and Dehkhān) is a village in Aqda Rural District, Aqda District, Ardakan County, Yazd Province, Iran. At the 2006 census, its population was 11, in 5 families.

References 

Populated places in Ardakan County